Melbourne  is a city in Brevard County, Florida, United States. As of the 2020 Decennial Census, there was a population of 84,678. The municipality is the second-largest in the county by both size and population. Melbourne is a principal city of the Palm Bay – Melbourne – Titusville, Florida Metropolitan Statistical Area. In 1969, the city was expanded by merging with nearby Eau Gallie.

History

Early human occupation

Evidence for the presence of Paleo-Indians in the Melbourne area during the late Pleistocene epoch was uncovered during the 1920s. C. P. Singleton, a Harvard University zoologist, discovered the bones of a mammoth (Mammuthus columbi) on his property along Crane Creek,  from Melbourne, and brought in Amherst College paleontologist Frederick B. Loomis to excavate the skeleton. Loomis found a second elephant, with a "large rough flint instrument" among fragments of the elephant's ribs. Loomis found in the same stratum mammoth, mastodon, horse, ground sloth, tapir, peccary, camel, and saber-tooth cat bones, all extinct in Florida since the end of the Pleistocene 10,000–8,000 BCE. At a nearby site a human rib and charcoal were found in association with Mylodon, Megalonyx, and Chlamytherium (ground sloth) teeth. A finely worked spear point found with these items may have been displaced from a later stratum. In 1925 attention shifted to the Melbourne golf course.

A crushed human skull with finger, arm, and leg bones was found in association with a horse tooth. A piece of ivory that appeared to have been modified by humans was found at the bottom of the stratum containing bones. Other finds included a spear point near a mastodon bone and a turtle-back scraper and blade found with bear, camel, mastodon, horse, and tapir bones.

Settlement

The first settlers arrived after 1877. They included Richard W. Goode, his father John Goode, Cornthwaite John Hector, Captain Peter Wright, Balaam Allen, Wright Brothers, and Thomas Mason. Three of these men, Wright, Allen, and Brothers were black freedmen.

The city, formerly called "Crane Creek", was named Melbourne in honor of its first postmaster, Cornthwaite John Hector, an Englishman who had spent much of his life in Melbourne, Victoria, Australia (which was in turn named after the British Prime Minister William Lamb, 2nd Viscount Melbourne). He is buried in the Melbourne Cemetery, along with many early residents in the area. The first school in Melbourne was built in 1883 and is on permanent exhibit on the campus of Florida Institute of Technology. By 1885, the town had 70 people. The Greater Allen Chapel African Methodist Episcopal Church was founded in 1885 and is still active.

In the late 1890s, the Brownlie-Maxwell Funeral Home opened and it is still in business. The oldest black-owned business in the county is Tucker's Cut-Rate plumbing. It opened in 1934.

In the early 1900s, houses were often built in the frame vernacular style.

In 1919, a fire destroyed most of the original downtown along Front Street. At the time, it was rebuilt west of US Hwy 1.

During the Jim Crow years, black people were required to enter movie theaters via a different entrance from whites and sit in the balcony. Gas stations had signs for rest rooms labeled "Men", "Women", and "Colored." This persisted until integration in the late 1960s.

In late 1942 the Naval Air Station Melbourne was established as a site to train newly commissioned Navy and Marine pilots for World War II. The program ran until 1946, and the land that was used for that program makes up most of what is currently the  Melbourne Orlando International Airport.

In 1969, the cities of Eau Gallie and Melbourne voted to merge, forming modern-day Melbourne.

Postwar

In the 1950s, Babcock Street was extended north to intersect with US 1. The Melbourne Shopping Center was constructed on Babcock, the area's first strip mall. Consumers were sufficiently attracted to this new mall, that the traditional downtown, off New Haven, suffered. Urban blight was successfully mitigated in the 1980s.

A board was created by the legislature to spend a 10% tax on electric bills. This was used by the Melbourne Civic Improvement Board to build the Melbourne Auditorium, the first library and fire station, and various parks. The board was dissolved when Melbourne was merged with Eau Gallie in 1969. That merger doubled the size of Melbourne.

Streetlights were gradually added until, by the early 1960s, streets east of Babcock Street had lights. Lights were added to streets west of Babcock after the early 1960s.

In 1969, the city elected Julius Montgomery, its first black councilman. Montgomery was also the first African American student of Brevard Engineering College, later Florida Institute of Technology which named their Pioneer Award after him.

On August 2, 1995, the city received a record  of rainfall from Hurricane Erin.

During the week of August 22, 2008, a record  of rain fell caused by Tropical Storm Fay.

A 2009 Halloween street party sponsored by a downtown restaurant attracted an estimated 8,000–10,000 people. This overwhelmed the downtown area. Street parties were curtailed until public safety issues were addressed.

On February 18, 2017, president Donald J. Trump held his first post-inauguration rally at the Orlando-Melbourne International Airport drawing a crowd of approximately 9,000 people according to the Melbourne police department.

Geography

It is approximately midway between Jacksonville and Miami.

The east–west street named Brevard Drive was historically the "center" of town; with addresses called "north" and "south" of this street. The north–south Babcock Street provided the same centerline for "east" and "west" directions.

Melbourne Beachside has a small presence on the South Beaches barrier island. It is often confused with Melbourne Beach, a separate political entity.

Climate

Melbourne, Florida has a humid subtropical climate (Cfa), bordering closely to a tropical savanna climate. Melbourne has a distinctly seasonal precipitation pattern, with a hot and wet season (late May through October) and a warm and dry season (November through April). The climate is strongly influenced by the nearby Atlantic Ocean and Gulf Stream, as well as incursions of cold fronts from the north in winter months.
 
Melbourne averages  of rainfall annually, much of it coming in convective thunderstorms in the late May to early October time period. The record rainfall occurred on August 20, 2008, when Tropical Storm Fay dropped . Melbourne can sometimes have moderate to severe drought conditions from late fall through spring, with brush fires occurring and water restrictions put in place. Melbourne averages 2 days per year with frost, although several years might pass without a frost in the city of Melbourne or at the ocean beaches. On Christmas Eve 2003, the city as others in east central coast of Florida received snow from the ocean effect, when cold air passes over the considerably hotter ocean and causes the rise of air with higher temperature to bring moisture into the higher portions of the atmosphere.

Flora

Tropical flora typical of more southerly locations is grown in the Melbourne area (coconut palms, royal palms, Christmas palms, and bananas), but can be damaged or killed when subjected to infrequent light freezes or cooler temperatures, although several years might pass without a freeze in the Melbourne area. The Melbourne area has many lush gardens and public landscapes, and is noted for the botanical northern limit of cultivated coconut palms on the Florida East Coast.

Environment

The Florida Department of Environmental Protection has ordered the city to reduce pollution of the Indian River Lagoon, which it borders; about 80% of the city's landmass drains in the direction of the lagoon. The city responded by banning the use of fertilizer before flood and storm warnings.

Demographics

As of 2010, there were 38,955 households, out of which 12.6% were vacant. As of 2000, 24.0% had children under the age of 18 living with them, 44.0% were married couples living together, 11.5% had a female householder with no husband present, and 40.7% were non-families. 32.9% of all households were made up of individuals, and 13.3% had someone living alone who was 65 years of age or older. The average household size was 2.22 and the average family size was 2.82.

In 2000, the city the population was spread out, with 20.7% under the age of 18, 9.3% from 18 to 24, 28.4% from 25 to 44, 21.9% from 45 to 64, and 19.7% who were 65 years of age or older. The median age was 40 years. For every 100 females, there were 94.3 males. For every 100 females age 18 and over, there were 91.1 males.

The per capita income for the city was $19,175. In 2000, the median income for a household in the city was $34,571, and the median income for a family was $42,760. Males had a median income of $32,242 versus $22,419 for females. In Melbourne, about 8.6% of families and 11.5% of the population were below the poverty line, including 15.4% of those under age 18 and 8.5% of those age 65 or over.

Languages

As of 2000, 90.39% of residents spoke English as their first language, while 4.69% spoke Spanish, 0.84% spoke French, 0.73% spoke German, and 0.55% spoke Arabic as their mother tongue. In total, 9.60% of the total population spoke languages other than English.

Government

The Melbourne City Council consists of the mayor and six district council members. Melbourne uses a Council-Manager form of government.

City officials 
 Paul Alfrey, Mayor – Elected November 2020, term expires November 2024
 Tim Thomas, District 1 Council Member – Elected in November 2016. Re-elected in November 2020, term expires November 2024
 Mark LaRusso, Vice Mayor & District 2 Council Member – Elected in November 2018. Re-elected in November 2022, term expires November 2026
 Yvonne Minus, District 3 Council Member – Elected in November 2016. Re-elected in November 2020, term expires November 2024
 Rachael Bassett, District 4 Council Member – Elected in November 2022, term expires November 2026
 Mimi Hanley, District 5 Council Member – Elected in November 2020, term expires November 2024
 Julie Sanders, District 6 Council Member – Elected in November 2018. Re-elected in November 2022, term expires November 2026

The following are appointed by the council:
 City Attorney
 City Manager

Melbourne city officials created the Babcock Street Redevelopment District in 1998 to stimulate new development along Babcock Street from U.S. 1 south to U.S. 192. A 218-unit apartment complex built in 2005 is most recent step in an effort to revitalize this area.

In 2010, the Eau Gallie Arts District received its designation as a Florida Main Street. Established in 1860 along the Indian River, the arts district (called EGAD!) has proven to be highly successful in its redevelopment of the community of art galleries, shops, restaurants, Melbourne's first microbrewery (Intracoastal Brewing Company), and contains the city civic center and public library with a public pier, Historic Rossetter House and Gardens, Pineapple Park, a few businesses over 40 years old, and a community park and band shell, which is the center of many community activities. It is now a non-accredited main street program.

A $180.8 million Operating and Capital Budget was passed for the 2014–2015 fiscal year.

In 2007, the city had a taxable real estate base of $4.96 billion.

A 2011 study rated the general pension fund for city employees highly at 190%. Less favorably rated were the pension plans for fire and police employees.

In 2009, the city had 870 full-time employees and 176 part-time employees.

Economy

Industry

Melbourne Orlando International Airport is located near the center of the city. Melbourne contains defense and technology companies with a high concentration of high-tech workers. The following corporations have operations in Melbourne:

 DRS Technologies employed 910 workers in 2009. Another reference says 1,800 workers in 2009, 1,300 in 2010.
 Alstom Signaling Operations Transportation Systems
 L3Harris Technologies (corporate headquarters)
 Northrop Grumman employed 1,640 workers in 2009.
 Rockwell Collins employed 1,430 in 2009.
 Embraer completed a  hangar and administrative office at the Melbourne Airport in February 2011.
 LiveTV has its headquarters in Melbourne.
 eviCore Healthcare has one of its main office in Melbourne.
 Avidyne Corporation an avionics company has their HQ in Melbourne and is a developer of Integrated Avionics Systems, multi-function displays, and traffic advisory systems for light general aviation (GA) aircraft.

Workforce

In 2007, the average size of Melbourne's labor force was 39,391. Of that group, 37,708 were employed and 1,683 were unemployed, for an unemployment rate of 4.3%.

Housing

In 2008, 259 building permits were issued for 263 units. There were 209 permits issued for 320 units in 2007, which was down from 329 permits for 512 units in 2006.

The median home price in 2007 was $215,000.

In May 2005, the Melbourne–Titusville–Palm Bay area was among the top 20 in home price appreciation from 2003 to 2004.

Competitiveness

In 2009, Forbes ranked the area 18th out of 100 Metropolitan Statistical Areas and first out of 8 metros in Florida for affordable housing, and short commute times, among others.

Retail and commerce

Melbourne has two downtown business districts, a result of the merger of Eau Gallie into Melbourne:
 Eau Gallie Arts District—located along the Indian River Lagoon with two public parks, two fine art galleries, a microbrewery and several other restaurants contained within one block. Known as EGAD, it is on the Florida Humanities FLORIDA STORIES historic audio-based walking tours app (download to your phone from the app store) and contains over 30 murals and three sculptures.
 Historic Downtown Melbourne – among other retail outlets, this has 26 eating and drinking establishments within a four block extent.

Healthcare

The city has three hospitals, day care for senior citizens, hospice, walk-in, and urgent care facilities. There is Holmes Medical Center, and Melbourne Regional Medical Center. Kindred Hospital is a chronic care facility for ventilated patients and does not accept emergency patients. A new Viera hospital was opened in May 2011.

Tourism

The city has two golf courses. There were 96,477 rounds played in 2009–10. Revenues were $2,207,502. Rounds and revenue have been dropping since 2006. in 2011, the city raised rates for residents to the same as for non-residents, $27 per round or $522 annual fee.

The Eau Gallie Arts District is regularly highlighted as a top destination in the national rankings that are published. Read more.

Retail

Brevard Mall, the area's first mall, was built in 1962. It was followed by Melbourne Square in 1982.

Arts and culture

Annual cultural events

In February or March:
 The Annual IndiaFest is held in February or March.

In April:
 The Melbourne Arts Festival, held in April in Wickham Park, draws from 50,000 to 60,000 visitors

In August:
 The Annual India Day is held in August.

In September:
 The Melbourne Area Pilots Association hosts a General Aviation Day at Melbourne International Airport in September

In October:
 The Melbourne Oktoberfest has been held each October since 1977; most recently, this was held at the Wickham Park Pavilion

In December:
 Christian churches have been producing a "Bible on Parade" since 1990, each participating church portrays a book of the Bible. A spokesperson said in 2011 that it may be the only one of its kind in America.

Museums and points of interest

Historic sites

There are four places on the National Register of Historic Places:
 Florida Power and Light Company Ice Plant (1927) located at 1604 South Harbor City Boulevard
 William H. Gleason House at 1736 Pineapple Avenue
 James Wadsworth Rossetter House (c. 1860s) at 1320 Highland Avenue
 Green Gables at Historic Riverview Village 1501 South Harbor City Blvd

The following places also are historic:
 Henegar Center (1919) located at 625 East New Haven Avenue
 Holy Trinity Episcopal Church (1886) at 50 West Strawbridge Avenue
 Melbourne Bone Bed at Crane Creek
 Nannie Lee House – Strawberry Mansion (1905) at 1218 East New Haven Avenue
 Roesch House (c. 1901) at 1320 Highland Avenue
 Winchester Symphony House (1890s) at 1500 Highland Avenue

Walking historic tours
Eau Gallie Arts District has an established historical walking tour that includes over 20 historical buildings or locations in the arts district available through a FLORIDA STORIES app to your phone.

Museums

 Historic Rossetter House Museum at 1320 Highland Avenue
 Liberty Bell Memorial Museum at 1601 Hickory Street

Performing arts

Melbourne Civic Theater

Groups

 Brevard Symphony Orchestra
 City of Melbourne Pipes and Drums
 Strawbridge Art League and Gallery

Buildings

 Henegar Center for the Arts
 Maxwell C. King Center for the Performing Arts
 Melbourne Auditorium located on Hibiscus Boulevard

Sports

Melbourne was an official host city for the 1996 Olympic Torch Relay.

There are co-ed adult and youth sports programs in flag football and ultimate frisbee.

The city of Melbourne hosts an annual indoor pickleball tournament called the Melbourne Meltdown Pickleball Championship. The third annual tournament was played on March 4–6, 2021 at the Melbourne Auditorium.

Parks, recreation, and attractions

 Brevard Zoo
 Wickham Park
 Lake Washington

One of the many forms of recreation is local fishing in places such as Lake Washington.

Public Libraries 

Melbourne houses three branches of Brevard County Public Libraries including the Dr. Martin Luther King, Jr. Public Library, Eau Gallie Public Library, and the Melbourne Public Library.

The first home of the Melbourne Public Library was established in 1924 with funds raised by the Library Association of Melbourne. The current Melbourne Public Library is a 25,000 square ft building located in Wells Park. It was first opened to the public in July 1989.

The Eau Gallie Public Library was also first opened in the 1920s, starting as a library for the Eau Gallie Woman's Club. In 1939, the club officially sponsored the small library, beginning with only 22 books. The current building opened in 1962, gradually expanding over the years. In October, 1990 the Eau Gallie Public Library had a collection of 67,023 volumes and over 25,000 registered borrowers, a testament to the faith of the founders of the Eau Gallie Woman's Club. The library is located in Riverfront Park overlooking the Indian River.

Education

Of all residents 25 years or older, 88.5% are high school graduates, and 25.7% have a bachelor's degree or higher.

Public schools are run by the Brevard County School Board.

Prior to 1964, segregated schools were maintained for white students and black students under the doctrine of Separate but equal education. Black students were educated at Melbourne Vocational School from 1921 until it burned in 1953. For the next five years they met in the former hospital of the Naval Air Station, until Stone High School was opened in 1958. In 1964 the schools were integrated and Stone was repurposed as Stone Middle School.

Colleges and universities

 Eastern Florida State College
 Florida Institute of Technology
 Florida State University Satellite Campus
 Keiser University – Melbourne
 University of Central Florida Regional Campus
 Webster University – Patrick Space Force Base Campus

Elementary schools

 Roy Allen Elementary
 Ascension Catholic School
 Brevard Academy for Individual Excellence
 Dr. W. J. Creel Elementary
 Croton Elementary
 Harbor City Elementary
 Holy Trinity Episcopal Academy Lower School (Pre-K–6)
 Longleaf Elementary
 Meadowlane Primary
 Meadowlane Intermediate
 New Covenant Christian School
 Our Lady of Lourdes Catholic School
 Quest Elementary
 Sabal Elementary
 Sherwood Elementary
 Suntree Elementary
 University Park Elementary
 West Melbourne Elementary

Middle schools

 Ascension Catholic School
 Brevard Academy for Individual Excellence
 DeLaura Middle School
 Central Middle School
 Covenant Christian School
 Florida Preparatory Academy
 Holy Trinity Episcopal Academy Upper School
 Johnson Middle School
 Our Lady of Lourdes Catholic School
 Stone Middle School

High schools

Public
 Eau Gallie High School
 Melbourne High School
 Palm Bay High School 
West Shore Junior – Senior High School

Private
 Brevard Academy for Individual Excellence
 Brevard Christian School
 Florida Preparatory Academy
 Holy Trinity Episcopal Academy Upper School
 Melbourne Central Catholic High School
 New Covenant Christian School

Adult education

 Palm Bay High Adult/Community Education
 South Area Adult Center

Media

Print

Brevard Business News is a weekly newspaper in Melbourne, Florida, United States covering business news and trends for the Space Coast. Fred Krupski started Brevard Business News in 1981, and Adrienne B. Roth purchased it in 1986.

Florida Today is the major daily newspaper serving Brevard County, Florida. The Gannett corporation started the paper in 1966. It covers the Space Coast and Central Florida. The other major paper is the Hometown News ln Melbourne.

Radio

WFIT 89.5 FM—this radio station is an NPR station based on the grounds of Florida Institute of Technology

Television

Melbourne is part of the Orlando television market. Cable is provided by Spectrum.

Infrastructure

Transportation

Major roads

It would like to resurface 5% of that each year. It was able to afford to pave half of that in 2013.

Roads in the older part of the city, in what is today the southeast, are oriented toward the north–south road, Babcock Street, with compass directions measured east and west from that road. In the same area, a very minor east–west road, Brevard Drive, separates compass directions north and south.
  U.S. 1 – Known officially  as Harbor City Boulevard, this road runs parallel to the Indian River on the far eastern side of the city. The highway is six-lanes throughout the city. Within the city limits, this road intersects two causeways: the Eau Gallie and Melbourne Causeways. Major intersections include University Boulevard, New Haven Avenue, U.S. 192, SR 508, CR 507, CR 5054, SR 518, CR 511, Lake Washington Road, and Post Road.
  U.S. 192 – Locally named New Haven Avenue, and Strawbridge Avenue in downtown, this road passes through commercial, entertainment, and retail areas of Melbourne. It serves as a route to Kissimmee and the tourist corridor of Orlando to the west, and the town of Indialantic to the east via the Melbourne Causeway. Major intersections include Evans Road/Hollywood Boulevard, Dairy Road, SR 507/CR 507, New Haven Avenue, and U.S. 1.
  Interstate 95 – This highway is six-lanes throughout its run in Melbourne. There are three exits within city limits: Exit 180 (U.S. 192), Exit 182 (Ellis Road), and Exit 183 (SR 518).
  SR A1A – This road runs along the barrier island portion of Melbourne and provides access to Indian Harbour Beach and Indialantic. There is only one major intersection: SR 518.
  SR 507 – The state road portion of Babcock Street, this road runs from the city limits of Palm Bay to U.S. 192, serving the Florida Institute of Technology along the way. Major intersections include Florida Avenue, University Boulevard, and U.S. 192.
  CR 507 – The county road portion of Babcock Street, this road runs from U.S. 192 to U.S. 1, serving one of the main economic centers of Melbourne. Major intersections include U.S. 192, SR 508, and U.S. 1.
  SR 508 – This road runs from U.S. 1 to the Melbourne Orlando International Airport. Major intersections include Air Terminal Parkway, Dr. Martin Luther King Jr. Boulevard, CR 507, and U.S. 1.
  CR 509 – Known locally as Wickham Road, this is one of the busiest roads in Melbourne: Up to 38,680 cars use Wickham Road weekdays, and the average is 33,850. Major intersections include Ellis Road/NASA Bouelvard, SR 5054/CR 5054, SR 518, CR 511, Lake Washington Boulevard, and Post Road.
  CR 511 – Known almost universally as John Rodes Boulevard while north–south and Aurora Road while east–west, this road enters from West Melbourne and ends at U.S. 1, running through some impoverished areas of the town. Major intersections include Ellis Road, SR 518, CR 509, and U.S. 1.
  SR 518 – Known locally as Eau Gallie Boulevard, this road's run is entirely in Melbourne, running from Interstate 95 to SR A1A over the Eau Gallie Causeway. It runs through the Eau Gallie Arts District. Major intersections include Interstate 95, SR 5054, CR 509, U.S. 1, SR 513, and SR A1A.
  SR 5054 – The state road designation being entirely unsigned, the road is mostly known as Sarno Road. It has a short run from SR 518 to CR 509, where Sarno Road continues as CR 5054.
  CR 5054 – The more urban portion of Sarno Road. Major intersections include CR 509, Croton Boulevard, Apollo Boulevard, and U.S. 1.

Rail

The Union Cypress Company Railroad ran east to west through south Melbourne in the early 1900s. The mill town of Hopkins was near the present-day streets of Mill Street and Main Street.

The Florida East Coast Railway (FEC) runs through Melbourne, staying west of U.S. 1 through its entire run. Into the early 1960s, passengers could take one of two Chicago-bound trains (on alternating days), the City of Miami or the South Wind (both via Birmingham) and the New York-bound East Coast Champion, Havana Special, and Miamian from Melbourne's Florida East Coast station. Into the latter 1950s, passengers could take the Dixie Flagler to Chicago via Atlanta from the station. The FEC operated local passenger service between Jacksonville and the Miami area until July 31, 1968.

The Brightline passenger rail company is considering service to extend north from West Palm Beach to the Space Coast, but so far, has passed over Melbourne for Cocoa.

Bus

 Space Coast Area Transit operates a public bus service in Melbourne and vicinity. The city subsidizes two routes internal to the city so Melbourne residents ride for free.
 Greyhound Bus Lines has a bus station in Melbourne

Airport

The airport has daily flights on six passenger airlines and a cargo one, including Delta, Delta Connection, American Eagle and Elite Airways.

Utilities

Power is provided by Florida Power and Light. Gas is provided by Florida City Gas.

Cable TV service is provided by Spectrum.

Traditional landline telephone service is mainly provided by AT&T, while some cable customers use Spectrum digital telephone (VOIP) service.

Internet service providers in Melbourne range from various 56 kbit/s providers, AT&T (formerly BellSouth) FastAccess DSL, and Spectrum cable internet. Fiber-optic networks are installed in the city mainly for business purposes and have not been integrated for home use.

The Water Department not only provides water for the city, but for surrounding towns and cities for a premium, including Melbourne Beach, Indialantic, Indian Harbour Beach, Satellite Beach, Palm Shores, Melbourne Village, West Melbourne, and a portion of unincorporated Brevard County south of the Pineda Causeway. In 2020, it served about 170,000 people. Wholesale water service is provided to West Melbourne. The total distribution area is about  Two water treatment plants take water from Lake Washington and deep wells, providing  of drinking water per day. This water is treated with chloramine and ozone. Almost annually, the city is obliged to substitute the stronger free chlorine for the summer months when algae blooms are prevalent. In 2003, water rates were $2.27/ sewer $4.47/.

Solid waste removal and recycling is provided by Solid Waste Management, part of the city of Melbourne's Environmental Community Outreach (ECO) Division.

Namesakes

Melbourne Square, in the city of Melbourne, located on US 192 west of downtown, is one of the largest shopping centers in Brevard County. In the 1960s, the motto of Melbourne was, "Crossroads to the Universe".

Notable people 

 Oliver Askew, professional racing driver for Andretti Autosport
 Thomas Barbour, author and naturalist, lived in Eau Gallie as a boy
 Peter Blount, former member of the World Cup Bobsled Team and of the US National Track and Field Team
 Bruce Bochy, manager of the World Champion San Francisco Giants Major League Baseball team
 Robbie Carrico, Season 7 contestant on American Idol
 Bobby Dall, bass player for the band Poison, resides in Melbourne
 Cecil Fielder, professional baseball player
 Prince Fielder, professional baseball player, son of Cecil Fielder, went to Eau Gallie High School
 William Henry Gleason, founded and lived in Eau Gallie
 Kristin Grubka, professional women's soccer player, FSU women's soccer national champion in 2014
 Darrell Hammond, comedian and actor, born and resided in Melbourne from 1955 to 1975
 Kim Hammond, former judge and former quarterback for Florida State University and American Football League, played football, basketball and baseball for Melbourne High School
 C.J. Hobgood, 2001 ASP world champion surfer, born in Melbourne
 Damien Hobgood, professional surfer born in Melbourne
 Devon Hughes, professional wrestler, better known as Brother Devon from Total Nonstop Action Wrestling
 Vicky Hurst, professional golfer, graduated from Holy Trinity
 Zora Neale Hurston, author, lived in Eau Gallie in the 1920s and 1950s
 Billy Lane, owner of Choppers, Inc. and builder of custom motorcycles
 Jeff Lett, bass player of Cartel, born in Melbourne
 Marcus Maye, professional NFL player for the New York Jets, attended Holy Trinity
 Jim Morrison, lead singer for The Doors, born in Melbourne
 Henry Mucci, US Army colonel who led the Great Raid in World War II to free the Bataan survivors, retired to Melbourne
 Bill Nelson, long-time U.S. senator from Florida, raised in Melbourne and graduated from Melbourne High School in 1960
 Reggie Nelson, safety for NFL's Oakland Raiders
 Jamie Noble, professional wrestler
 Hans von Ohain, one of the first people to develop the jet engine, retired and died in Melbourne
 Stanford Parris, former U.S. congressman from Virginia, was a primary resident of Melbourne after leaving Congress
 Will Perdue, NBA forward and center (Chicago Bulls), sportscaster, born in Melbourne
 Toni Pressley, professional women's soccer player, graduated from West Shore High School in 2008
 Tom Rapp, singer-songwriter, leader of 1960s/1970s band Pearls Before Swine
 Taylor Rowan, American football placekicker
 Melana Scantlin, actress
 Stefanie Scott, teenage actress born in Melbourne, stars on the Disney show A.N.T. Farm
 Lee Stange, professional baseball pitcher
 Jason Steele, state representative from 1980 to 1982
 Robbin Thompson, singer-songwriter
 Amber Torrealba, professional skimboarder
 George Trofimoff, former U.S. Army colonel and convicted spy for the Soviet Union, lived in Melbourne from 1994 to 2000
 Kate Upton, model, 2012 Sports Illustrated swimsuit issue cover girl
 Tim Wakefield, baseball pitcher for the (Boston Red Sox), born in Melbourne
 Matt Walters, defensive end for the New York Jets
 Leonard Weaver, National Football League fullback
 Larry Wolfe, Major League Baseball infielder
 Mickey Zofko, National Football League running back
 The Learning Station, kids' band founded in 1987

References

Further reading

Purdy, Barbara A. (2008). Florida's People During the Last Ice Age. University Press of Florida.

External links

 
 

 
1867 establishments in Florida
Helen Blazes
Cities in Brevard County, Florida
Cities in Florida
Populated coastal places in Florida on the Atlantic Ocean
Populated places established in 1867
Populated places on the St. Johns River